Alexander Opoku (born 31 August 1974) is a Ghanaian former professional footballer who played as a midfielder.

Club career
Opoku played in Ghana for Brong Ahafo United from age 15, before moving to Germany where he joined VfB Leipzig. With Leipzig he played in the Bundesliga, making 10 appearances and scoring one goal. He made his debut in the 1993–94 season, coming off the bench in the 75th minute for Matthias Liebers against Eintracht Frankfurt on the eleventh matchday, as the match would finish in a 2–1 loss. Opoku's other appearances in the Bundesliga also remained winless, as Leipzig finished bottom of the table with only 17 points. After being relegated to the 2. Bundesliga, he made 54 appearances in the next four seasons and scored three goals. 

Opoku left the club after the 1997–98 season, after Leipzig were once again relegated. He moved to FC Remscheid for one season, then to FSV Frankfurt in the Regionalliga Süd. Later he played for SV Rot-Weiß Bad Muskau.

International career
Opoku was a member of the Ghana U17 that won the 1991 FIFA U-17 World Championship. He led the team, which was coached by Otto Pfister, as the captain.

Honours
Ghana U17
 FIFA U-17 World Cup: 1991

References

1974 births
Living people
Ghanaian footballers
Ghana youth international footballers
Ghanaian expatriate footballers
BA Stars F.C. players
1. FC Lokomotive Leipzig players
FC Remscheid players
FSV Frankfurt players
Bundesliga players
2. Bundesliga players
Regionalliga players
Expatriate footballers in Germany
Ghanaian expatriate sportspeople in Germany
Association football midfielders
People from Sunyani District